Dimo André Wache (born 1 November 1973 in Brake, Lower Saxony) is a German former professional footballer who played for 1. FSV Mainz 05 as a goalkeeper for fifteen years.
He is one of three Mainz 05 honorary team captains.

References

External links 

1973 births
Living people
People from Brake, Lower Saxony
Footballers from Lower Saxony
German footballers
Association football goalkeepers
Germany youth international footballers
Germany under-21 international footballers
VfB Oldenburg players
Borussia Mönchengladbach players
1. FSV Mainz 05 players
Bundesliga players
2. Bundesliga players